Catherine Dunn(e), Katherine Dunn(e), or variants, may refer to:

People

Dunn
Catherine Dunn (school administrator), President of Clarke College in Dubuque, Iowa, U.S., 1984–2006
Catherine Dunn (singer), featured in the Tim McGraw 2015 song "Diamond Rings and Old Barstools"
Cathy Dunn (born 1949), American politician 
Katherine Dunn (1945–2016), American writer
Katie Dunn (boxer) in 2005 and 2006 Women's World Amateur Boxing Championships
 Katie Marie Dunn, a perpetrator of the 1999 Kingwood robbery incidents
Katy Dunne (born 1995), British tennis player
Katrina Dunn (fl. from 1989), Canadian actor, director, and producer

Dunne
 Catherine Dunne (writer) (born 1954), Irish writer
 Catherine Dunne (bombing victim), nun fatally injured by the 1990 Armagh City roadside bomb

Fictional characters
 Katie Dunn, in ABC Afterschool Special, played by Jennifer Dundas
 Katie Dunn, in Seconds Apart

See also
Katie Dunn (disambiguation)
Kathleen Dunn (disambiguation)
Katrina Dunn, Canadian actress
 The Picture of Kathleen Dunne, a song on the 1970 Oliver album Again